Archusa Creek is a stream in the U.S. state of Mississippi. It is a tributary to the Chickasawhay River.

Archusa most likely is a name derived from the Choctaw language meaning "little creek".

References

Rivers of Mississippi
Rivers of Clarke County, Mississippi
Mississippi placenames of Native American origin